Liu I-chou is a Taiwanese politician. He was the acting chairperson and subsequently the chairperson of the Central Election Commission (CEC) of the Republic of China since 1 August 2014 until 3 November 2017.

Education
Liu obtained his bachelor's and master's degrees in law from National Chengchi University in 1973 and 1977, respectively. He then obtained his doctoral degree in political science from University of Michigan in the United States in 1990.

Central Election Commission
Liu served as the vice chairperson of the CEC from 2009 until 2014, when he became the acting chairperson of the commission after the former chairperson, Chang Po-ya, resigned from the position to take the position of the president of Control Yuan. He was then officially appointed as the chairperson on 29 January 2015.

See also
 Executive Yuan
 Elections in the Republic of China

References

1948 births
Living people
Political office-holders in the Republic of China on Taiwan
University of Michigan alumni
National Chengchi University alumni